The 2006–07 Carolina Hurricanes season began as the defending Stanley Cup champions started to defend their title. The Hurricanes did not make any substantial changes to their roster, hoping that their lineup would be enough to get them a repeat as NHL champions.  However, due to many factors, including a shortened off-season due to last season's Stanley Cup run, injuries and disappointing performances from the team's young stars (including Eric Staal and Cam Ward), the team failed to qualify for the post-season becoming the first team since the 1995–96 New Jersey Devils to miss the playoffs after winning the Stanley Cup the previous year.

Regular season

Season standings

Schedule and results

October

November

December

January

February

March

April

Green background indicates win.     
Red background indicates regulation loss.   
White background indicates overtime/shootout loss.

Playoffs 

The fans and players had high hopes for that season because the Hurricanes won the Stanley Cup the previous year. Unfortunately, the season ended in disappointment as the Hurricanes missed the playoffs for the first time since the 2003-04 season.

Player stats

Transactions

Trades

Free agents acquired

Free agents lost

Draft picks
Carolina's picks at the 2006 NHL Entry Draft in Vancouver, British Columbia.

References

Game log: Carolina Hurricanes game log on ESPN.com
Team standings: NHL standings on ESPN.com
Player stats: Carolina Hurricanes player stats on NHL.com

Carol
Carol
Carolina Hurricanes seasons
Hurr
Hurr